Echo des Ostens ('Echo of the East') was a newspaper published daily from Königsberg. It was the organ of the East Prussia district organization (bezirk) of the Communist Party of Germany 1922-1933. Echo des Ostens replaced an earlier Köningsberg party publication, Die rote Fahne des Ostens. The young Martin Hoffmann was the editor of Echo des Ostens until 1926. As of 1930, it had an estimated circulation of 22,800.

References

Communist Party of Germany
Defunct newspapers published in Germany
German-language communist newspapers
Mass media in Kaliningrad
Daily newspapers published in Germany
Publications established in 1922
Publications disestablished in 1933